Ismael Merlo (1 September 1918 – 10 September 1984) was a Spanish actor. He appeared in 82 films and television shows between 1941 and 1984. He starred in the 1966 film La caza, which won the Silver Bear for Best Director at the 16th Berlin International Film Festival.

Partial filmography

 Stowaway on Board (1941) - Antonciño
 Rojo y negro (1942) - Miguel
 The Wheel of Life (1942) - Alberto del Vall
 No te niegues a vivir (1942)
 La niña está loca (1943) - Enrique
 Cristina Guzmán (1943) - Marqués de Atalanta
 Idols (1943) - Juan Luis Gallardo
 Cuento de hadas (1951) - Jaime
 La moza de cántaro (1954) - Felipe IV
 Pescando millones (1959)
 Llegaron los franceses  (1959)
 La fiel infantería (1960) - Andrés
 Litri and His Shadow (1960) - Pepe Aguayo
 Three Ladies (1960) - Dr. San Román
 Ventolera (1962) - Máximo
 Aprendiendo a morir (1962) - Rafael Sánchez
 La viudita naviera (1962) - Santiago Filgueras
 Mentirosa (1962) - Chili
 Los que no fuimos a la guerra (1962) - Pons
 You and Me Are Three (1962) - Dr. Alberto Cendreras
 Sabían demasiado (1962) - Don Rafael, 'El cajero'
 Escuela de seductoras (1962) - Enrique
 Trigo limpio (1962) - Jerónimo
 Llovidos del cielo (1962)
 Esa pícara pelirroja (1963) - Pablo Corell
 El sol en el espejo (1963) - Salazar
 La pandilla de los once (1963) - Toni antes del cambio imagen
 La batalla del domingo (1963) - El risitas
 Trampa mortal (1963) - Don Tomás
 El precio de un asesino (1963) - John Berstein
 La chica del trébol (1964) - D. Andrés
 A Canção da Saudade (1964) - Leonel
 La boda era a las doce (1964) - Andrés
 Fin de semana (1964) - Don Alejandro Orteu
 Los gatos negros (1964)
 La caza (1966) - José
 Las viudas (1966) - Médico del Hotel (segment "El Aniversario")
 Jugando a morir (1966) - Empresario
 The Cannibal Man (1972) - Jefe de personal
 Experiencia prematrimonial (1972) - Andrés, padre de Alejandra
 Flor de santidad (1973) - Electus, el ciego
 Las señoritas de mala compañía (1973) - Don Pedro
 Tormento (1974) - Padre Nones
 Una pareja... distinta (1974) - Manolo
 The Marriage Revolution (1974) - Padre de Begoña
 La madrastra (1974) - Marcos
 Furtivos (1975) - Cura
 Las protegidas (1975) - Ignacio Aguirre
 Madrid, Costa Fleming (1976) - Sr. Conca
 Las largas vacaciones del 36 (1976) - El Abuelo
 Los hijos de... (1976) - Mauricio
 Climax (1977) - Don Rafael / Art teacher
 Paco l'infaillible (1979) - Marqués
 La campanada (1980) - Padre
 The Autonomines (1983) - Don Ángel
 Los hermanos Cartagena (1984) - Padre de Daniel

References

External links

1918 births
1984 deaths
Spanish male film actors
People from Valencia
20th-century Spanish male actors